Soth is a surname in various cultures, as well as a given name in Southeast Asia.

Origins
As a Khmer name, Soth originates from a word meaning "clean", "pure", or "white". That word originated from Sanskrit . The English surname Soth comes from Middle English  meaning "truth" or "justice", and can be found in records in England dating back to the 13th century.

Statistics
The 2010 United States Census found 662 people with the surname Soth, making it the 34,272nd-most-common name in the country. This represented an increase from 621 (34,503rd-most-common) in the 2000 Census. In the 2010 census, slightly more than three-fifths of the bearers of the surname identified as Asian, and one-third as White.

Surname
Lauren K. Soth (1910–1998), American journalist
Bob Soth (born 1933), American long-distance runner
Soth Polin (born 1943), Cambodian writer
Soth Sun (born 1946), Cambodian boxer
Alec Soth (born 1969), American photographer

Fictional characters:
Lord Soth, in Dragonlance and Ravenloft
Norman Soth, in the video game Tom Clancy's Splinter Cell

Given name
Soth Phetrasy (1915–2004), Lao Pathet official
Chea Soth (1928–2012), Cambodian politician, MP for Prey Veng Province
Mom Soth, Cambodian actor

See also
Wilhelm Söth (1903–1978), German general of World War II

References

Khmer-language names